La Guerra la gano yo (I Win the War) is a 1943 Argentine comedy film.

Production
The 71-minute black and white film was produced for Lumiton by Francisco Múgica and released on 14 February 1943.
The script was by Carlos A. Olivari, Sixto Pondal Ríos.
The film starred Pepe Arias, Ricardo Passano and Alberto Contreras.
The actress Virginia Luque made her debut in the film at the age of sixteen.

Synopsis

The owner of a small but prosperous department store, played by Pepe Arias, is pushed by his family to improve their social position.
He makes heavy investments in the rubber tire business.
When World War II begins, he finds that overnight he has become fabulously rich.
He closes a huge deal with the Germans, but his delight turns to horror when he finds that they have sunk an Allied ship carrying his son.
The film combines humor with biting comment on Argentina's neutral stance in the war.

Cast
The cast included:

 Pepe Arias 
 Ricardo Passano
 Alberto Contreras
 Virginia Luque 
 Gogó Andreu 
 Chela Cordero
 Perla Alvarado
 Esperanza Palomero 
 Jorge Salcedo 
 Carlos Montalbán 
 Malena Podestá 
 Bernardo Perrone
 Percival Murray 
 Mercedes Gisper
 Warly Ceriani 
 Sofía Merli

References
Citations

Sources

1943 films
1940s Spanish-language films
Argentine black-and-white films
Films directed by Francisco Múgica
Argentine comedy films
1943 comedy films
1940s Argentine films